Lightning Bug was published in 1970. It is a story of lost love and the search for a rekindling of that love by main character Latha Bourne. Donald Harington wrote this novel as a tribute to his childhood home.

Plot 
The novel starts with a depiction of the mood and setting of a hot summer night in the tiny (and fictional) Ozarks village of Stay More, using rich description to invoke all of the senses. The story focuses on the complicated relationships of the main character, Stay More's postmaster, Latha Bourne, with the narrator Dawny (a boy of 5 or 6 who loves Latha and spends as much time as he can with her, listening to her ghost stories), with a teen-aged girl named Sonora who (like Dawny) lives in Stay More during the summers, and with an itinerant preacher named Every Dill, who, it turns out, has a long and complicated history with Latha. The story moves between several different time-lines within Latha's life, from the present-day in which Every Dill shows up while Dawny and Sonora are summering in Stay More to Latha's memories of Every when they were children and teen-agers in Stay More to her years in a Little Rock asylum as a young adult.

Characters
 Donald: “Dawny,” 5 or 6, narrator, in love with Latha, tousle-haired, spending summer with aunt
 Sonora: 17, red hair, niece of Latha, from Little Rock, spending summer with aunt
 Latha Bourne: postmistress, about 39, storyteller, feeds about 24 cats
 Every Dill: Latha's old lover/ beau who comes back to town as a preacher

Minor Characters:
 Oren (“Junior”) Duckworth, Jr. and his brother Chester – best-looking
 Earl, Burl, and Gerald – triplet sons of Lawlor Coe the blacksmith
 John Henry (“Hank”) Ingledew – nephew to Raymond Ingledew and lover of Sonora
 Raymond Ingledew – Latha's beau who went missing in the war
 JD Pruitt – comes from up north in Newton County
 Eddie Churchwell and Dorsey Tharp – from downstate
 Tearle Ingledew – the village drunk who proposes to Latha often
 Dolph Rivett – a man Latha means while fishing with whom she makes love with while they are together

Elements of the novel
 Losing love and attempting to restore that love
 Metaphors: marriage and mating
 Promiscuity – “making – love” is a rite of passage that occurs when people are really young and it is a natural thing to do

References

1970 American novels